Nickel(II) chromate (NiCrO4) is an acid-soluble compound, red-brown in color, with high tolerances for heat.  It and the ions that compose it have been linked to tumor formation and gene mutation, particularly to wildlife.

Synthesis

Nickel(II) chromate can be formed in the lab by heating a mixture of chromium(III) oxide and nickel oxide at between 700 °C and 800 °C under oxygen at 1000 atm pressure. It can be produced at 535 °C and 7.3 bar oxygen, but the reaction takes days to complete. If the pressure is too low or temperature too high but above 660 °C, then the nickel chromium spinel NiCr2O4 forms instead.

Karin Brandt also claimed to make nickel chromate using a hydrothermal technique.

Precipitates of Ni2+ ions with chromate produce a brown substance that contains water.

Properties

The structure of nickel chromate is the same as for chromium vanadate, CrVO4. Crystals have an orthorhombic structure with unit cell sizes a = 5.482 Å, b = 8.237 Å, c = 6.147 Å. The cell volume is 277.6 Å3 with four formula per unit cell.

Nickel chromate is dark in colour, unlike most other chromates which are yellow. The infrared spectrum of nickel chromate show two sets of absorption bands. The first includes lines at 925, 825, and 800 cm−1 due to Cr-O stretching, and the second has lines at 430, 395, 365 (very weak) due to Cr-O rock and bend and 310 cm−1 produced from Ni-O stretching.

Reaction

When heated at lower oxygen pressure around 600 °C, nickel chromate decomposes to the nickel chromite spinel, nickel oxide and oxygen.

4 NiCrO4 → 2 NiCr2O4 + 2 NiO + 3 O2 (gas)

Related
Nickel chromates can also crystallize with ligands. For instance, with 1,10-phenanthroline it can form triclinic olive-colored crystals of [Ni(1,10-phenanthroline)CrO4•3H2O]•H2O, orange crystals of Ni(1,10-phenanthroline)3Cr2O7•3H2O, and yellow powdered Ni(1,10-phenanthroline)3Cr2O7•8H2O.

References

Nickel compounds
Chromates
Oxidizing agents